Stenidia is a genus of beetles in the family Carabidae, containing the following species:

 Stenidia abdominalis Chaudoir, 1862 
 Stenidia angulata Liebke, 1933 
 Stenidia angusta Peringuey, 1896 
 Stenidia approximans Barker, 1919 
 Stenidia bicolor Alluaud, 1936 
 Stenidia blanda Laferte-Senectere, 1849 
 Stenidia corusca Laferte-Senectere, 1849 
 Stenidia edwardsii Laporte De Castelnau, 1843 
 Stenidia elegantula Peringuey, 1896 
 Stenidia fraterna Peringuey, 1896 
 Stenidia hovana Fairmaire, 1884 
 Stenidia jucunda Peringuey, 1896 
 Stenidia lenta Liebke, 1938 
 Stenidia mareei Basilewsky, 1949 
 Stenidia metallica Burgeon, 1937 
 Stenidia nigricollis Basilewsky, 1970 
 Stenidia quadricollis Chaudoir, 1872 
 Stenidia rugicollis (Fairmaire, 1897) 
 Stenidia spinipennis Putzeys, 1880 
 Stenidia unicolor Brulle, 1834 
 Stenidia viridis Liebke, 1933

References

Lebiinae